"This Girl Was Made for Loving" is a single released for the soundtrack of the 1997 film Obsession, sung by German actress Heike Makatsch and German singer Bela B.

Track listing
 Heike & Dirk: This Girl Was Made for Loving - 3:06
 Heike & Dirk: This Girl Was Made for Loving (Some Evil Falcons Mix) - 4:06
 Déjeuner sur l'herbe - 2:43
 Niagara (Final Theme) - 2:36

1997 singles
Bela B. songs
Songs written by Bela B.
1997 songs
Columbia Records singles